This list of 1987 motorsport champions is a list of national or international auto racing series with a Championship decided by the points or positions earned by a driver from multiple races.

Open wheel racing

Karting

Sports car

Touring car

Stock car

Rallying

Motorcycle

See also
 List of motorsport championships
 Auto racing

1987 in motorsport
1987